Silvan Province was an electorate of the Victorian Legislative Council. It existed as a two-member electorate from 1992 to 2006, with members holding alternating eight-year terms. It was considered a safe seat for the Liberal Party for much of its history, but was a surprise gain for the Labor Party in the party's landslide victory at the 2002 state election. The electorate saw some controversy in its final term when both its members, Labor MLC Carolyn Hirsh and Liberal MLC Andrew Olexander were expelled from their respective parties for drink-driving offences. The electorate was abolished from the 2006 state election in the wake of the Bracks Labor government's reform of the Legislative Council.

It was located in the outer east of Melbourne. In 2002, when it was last contested, it covered an area of 355 km2 and included the suburbs of Bayswater, Belgrave, Boronia, Croydon, Monbulk, Ringwood, Upwey, Wantirna and Warrandyte.

Members for Silvan Province

Election results

References
 http://www.parliament.vic.gov.au/re-member/bioregsearch.cfm

Former electoral provinces of Victoria (Australia)
1992 establishments in Australia
2006 disestablishments in Australia